In mathematics (specifically multivariable calculus), a multiple integral is a definite integral of a function of several real variables, for instance,  or . For multiple integrals of a single-variable function, see the Cauchy formula for repeated integration.

Introduction
Just as the definite integral of a positive function of  one variable represents the area of the region between the graph of the function and the -axis, the double integral of a positive function of two variables represents the volume of the region between the surface defined by the function (on the three-dimensional Cartesian plane where ) and the plane which contains its domain. If there are more variables, a multiple integral will yield hypervolumes of multidimensional functions.

Multiple integration of a function in  variables:  over a domain  is most commonly represented by nested integral signs in the reverse order of execution (the leftmost integral sign is computed last), followed by the function and integrand arguments in proper order (the integral with respect to the rightmost argument is computed last). The domain of integration is either represented symbolically for every argument over each integral sign, or is abbreviated by a variable at the rightmost integral sign:

Since the concept of an antiderivative is only defined for functions of a single real variable, the usual definition of the indefinite integral does not immediately extend to the multiple integral.

Mathematical definition
For , consider a so-called "half-open" -dimensional hyperrectangular domain , defined as:

Partition each interval  into a finite family  of non-overlapping subintervals , with each subinterval closed at the left end, and open at the right end.

Then the finite family of subrectangles  given by

Intuitively, as the diameter of the partition  is restricted smaller and smaller, the number of subrectangles  gets larger, and the measure  of each subrectangle grows smaller. The function  is said to be Riemann integrable if the limit

Frequently this notation is abbreviated as

 

The Riemann integral of a function defined over an arbitrary bounded -dimensional set can be defined by extending that function to a function defined over a half-open rectangle whose values are zero outside the domain of the original function. Then the integral of the original function over the original domain is defined to be the integral of the extended function over its rectangular domain, if it exists.

In what follows the Riemann integral in  dimensions will be called the multiple integral.

Properties
Multiple integrals have many properties common to those of integrals of functions of one variable (linearity, commutativity, monotonicity, and so on). One important property of multiple integrals is that the value of an integral is independent of the order of integrands under certain conditions. This property is popularly known as Fubini's theorem.

Particular cases
In the case of  the integral

Notice that, by convention, the double integral has two integral signs, and the triple integral has three; this is a notational convention which is convenient when computing a multiple integral as an iterated integral, as shown later in this article.

Methods of integration
The resolution of problems with multiple integrals consists, in most cases, of finding a way to reduce the multiple integral to an iterated integral, a series of integrals of one variable, each being directly solvable. For continuous functions, this is justified by Fubini's theorem. Sometimes, it is possible to obtain the result of the integration by direct examination without any calculations.

The following are some simple methods of integration:

Integrating constant functions
Example. Let  and

in which case

since by definition we have:

Use of symmetry
When the domain of integration is symmetric about the origin with respect to at least one of the variables of integration and the integrand is odd with respect to this variable, the integral is equal to zero, as the integrals over the two halves of the domain have the same absolute value but opposite signs. When the integrand is even with respect to this variable, the integral is equal to twice the integral over one half of the domain, as the integrals over the two halves of the domain are equal.

Example 1. Consider the function  integrated over the domain

a disc with radius 1 centered at the origin with the boundary included.

Using the linearity property, the integral can be decomposed into three pieces:

The function  is an odd function in the variable  and the disc  is symmetric with respect to the -axis, so the value of the first integral is 0. Therefore the original integral is equal to the area of the disk times 5, or 5.

Example 2. Consider the function  and as integration region the ball with radius 2 centered at the origin,

The "ball" is symmetric about all three axes, but it is sufficient to integrate with respect to -axis to show that the integral is 0, because the function is an odd function of that variable.

Normal domains on 

This method is applicable to any domain  for which:
 the projection of  onto either the -axis or the -axis is bounded by the two values,  and 
Such a domain will be here called a normal domain.  Elsewhere in the literature, normal domains are sometimes called type I or type II domains, depending on which axis the domain is fibred over.  In all cases, the function to be integrated must be Riemann integrable on the domain, which is true (for instance) if the function is continuous.

-axis
Then, by Fubini's theorem:

-axis
Again, by Fubini's theorem:

Normal domains on 

Change of variables

The limits of integration are often not easily interchangeable (without normality or with complex formulae to integrate). One makes a change of variables to rewrite the integral in a more "comfortable" region, which can be described in simpler formulae. To do so, the function must be adapted to the new coordinates.

Example 1a.
 the differentials  and  transform via the absolute value of the determinant of the Jacobian matrix containing the partial derivatives of the transformations regarding the new variable (consider, as an example, the differential transformation in polar coordinates).

Polar coordinates

In  if the domain has a circular symmetry and the function has some particular characteristics one can apply the transformation to polar coordinates (see the example in the picture) which means that the generic points  in Cartesian coordinates switch to their respective points in polar coordinates. That allows one to change the shape of the domain and simplify the operations.

The fundamental relation to make the transformation is the following:

Example 2a.

Example 2b.

using the Pythagorean trigonometric identity (very useful to simplify this operation).

Example 2c.

Example 2d. Therefore the transformed domain will be the following rectangle:

The Jacobian determinant of that transformation is the following:

Once the function is transformed and the domain evaluated, it is possible to define the formula for the change of variables in polar coordinates:

 is valid in the  interval while , which is a measure of a length, can only have positive values.

Example 2e. Now we change the function:

finally let's apply the integration formula:

Once the intervals are known, you have

Cylindrical coordinates

In  the integration on domains with a circular base can be made by the passage to cylindrical coordinates; the transformation of the function is made by the following relation:

The domain transformation can be graphically attained, because only the shape of the base varies, while the height follows the shape of the starting region.

Example 3a.

(that is, the parallelepiped whose base is similar to the rectangle in Example 2d and whose height is 5).

Because the  component is unvaried during the transformation, the  differentials vary as in the passage to polar coordinates: therefore, they become .

Finally, it is possible to apply the final formula to cylindrical coordinates:

This method is convenient in case of cylindrical or conical domains or in regions where it is easy to individuate the z interval and even transform the circular base and the function.

Example 3b.

while the function becomes

Finally one can apply the integration formula:

developing the formula you have

Spherical coordinates

In  some domains have a spherical symmetry, so it's possible to specify the coordinates of every point of the integration region by two angles and one distance. It's possible to use therefore the passage to spherical coordinates; the function is transformed by this relation:

Points on the -axis do not have a precise characterization in spherical coordinates, so  can vary between 0 and 2.

The better integration domain for this passage is the sphere.

Example 4a.

The Jacobian determinant of this transformation is the following:

This yields the final integration formula:

The extra  and  come from the Jacobian.

Its transformation is very easy:

while we know the intervals of the transformed region  from :

We therefore apply the integration formula:

and, developing, we get

Example 4c. The domain  is the ball with center at the origin and radius ,

Looking at the domain, it seems convenient to adopt the passage to spherical coordinates, in fact, the intervals of the variables that delimit the new  region are obviously:

However, applying the transformation, we get

Applying the formula for integration we obtain:

which can be solved by turning it into an iterated integral.

.

,

,

.

Collecting all parts,

.

Alternatively, this problem can be solved by using the passage to cylindrical coordinates. The new  intervals are

The new function is simply . Applying the integration formula

Then we get

Thanks to the passage to cylindrical coordinates it was possible to reduce the triple integral to an easier one-variable integral.

See also the differential volume entry in nabla in cylindrical and spherical coordinates.

Examples

Double integral over a rectangle 
Let us assume that we wish to integrate a multivariable function  over a region :

From this we formulate the iterated integral

In cases where the double integral of the absolute value of the function is finite, the order of integration is interchangeable, that is, integrating with respect to x first and integrating with respect to y first produce the same result. That is Fubini's theorem. For example, doing the previous calculation with order reversed gives the same result:

Double integral over a normal domain 

Consider the region (please see the graphic in the example):
 
Calculate

This domain is normal with respect to both the x- and y-axes. To apply the formulae it is required to find the functions that determine D and the intervals over which these functions are defined. In this case the two functions are:

while the interval is given by the intersections of the functions with x = 0, so the interval is [a, b] = [0, 1] (normality has been chosen with respect to the x-axis for a better visual understanding).

It is now possible to apply the formula:

(at first the second integral is calculated considering x as a constant). The remaining operations consist of applying the basic techniques of integration:

If we choose normality with respect to the y-axis we could calculate

and obtain the same value.

Calculating volume 
Using the methods previously described, it is possible to calculate the volumes of some common solids.
 Cylinder: The volume of a cylinder with height  and circular base of radius  can be calculated by integrating the constant function  over the circular base, using polar coordinates.

This is in agreement with the formula for the volume of a prism

 Sphere: The volume of a sphere with radius  can be calculated by integrating the constant function 1 over the sphere, using spherical coordinates.

 Tetrahedron (triangular pyramid or 3-simplex): The volume of a tetrahedron with its apex at the origin and edges of length  along the -, - and -axes can be calculated by integrating the constant function 1 over the tetrahedron.

This is in agreement with the formula for the volume of a pyramid

Multiple improper integral
In case of unbounded domains or functions not bounded near the boundary of the domain, we have to introduce the double improper integral or the triple improper integral.

Multiple integrals and iterated integrals

Fubini's theorem states that if

that is, if the integral is absolutely convergent, then the multiple integral will give the same result as either of the two iterated integrals:

If the integral is not absolutely convergent, care is needed not to confuse the concepts of multiple integral and iterated integral, especially since the same notation is often used for either concept. The notation

means, in some cases, an iterated integral rather than a true double integral. In an iterated integral, the outer integral

A double integral, on the other hand, is defined with respect to area in the -plane. If the double integral exists, then it is equal to each of the two iterated integrals (either "" or "") and one often computes it by computing either of the iterated integrals. But sometimes the two iterated integrals exist when the double integral does not, and in some such cases the two iterated integrals are different numbers, i.e., one has

This is an instance of rearrangement of a conditionally convergent integral.

On the other hand, some conditions ensure that the two iterated integrals are equal even though the double integral need not exist. Moreover, existence of the inner integrals ensures existence of the outer integrals. The double integral need not exist in this case even as Lebesgue integral, according to Sierpiński.

The notation

may be used if one wishes to be emphatic about intending a double integral rather than an iterated integral.

Triple integral 

Triple integral was demonstrated by Fubini's theorem. Drichlet theorem and Liouville 's extension theorem on Triple integral.

Some practical applications
Quite generally, just as in one variable, one can use the multiple integral to find the average of a function over a given set.

Additionally, multiple integrals are used in many applications in physics. The examples below also show some variations in the notation.

In mechanics, the moment of inertia is calculated as the volume integral (triple integral) of the density weighed with the square of the distance from the axis:

The gravitational potential associated with a mass distribution given by a mass measure  on three-dimensional Euclidean space  is

In electromagnetism, Maxwell's equations can be written using multiple integrals to calculate the total magnetic and electric fields. In the following example, the electric field produced by a distribution of charges given by the volume charge density  is obtained by a triple integral of a vector function:

This can also be written as an integral with respect to a signed measure representing the charge distribution.

See also
 Main analysis theorems that relate multiple integrals:
 Divergence theorem
 Stokes' theorem
 Green's theorem

References

Further reading
 
 
Herman, Edwin “Jed” & Strang, Gilbert (2016): Calculus : Volume 3 : OpenStax, Rice University, Houston, Texas, USA. . (PDF)

External links
 
 
 Mathematical Assistant on Web online evaluation of double integrals in Cartesian coordinates and polar coordinates (includes intermediate steps in the solution, powered by Maxima (software))

Integral calculus
Multivariable calculus

de:Integralrechnung#Mehrdimensionale Integration